

1999

See also 
 1999 in Australia
 1999 in Australian television
List of 1999 box office number-one films in Australia

External links 
 Australian film at the Internet Movie Database

1999
Lists of 1999 films by country or language
Films